Saint Petersburg Lyceum 30, is a public high school in Saint Petersburg, Russia that specializes in mathematics and physics. The school opened in 1897 became a specialized city school in 1965. The school is noted for its strong academic programs, and is also well known for its computer section named CGSG (Computer Graphics Support Group), whose members hold top positions at various programming contests.

History 

The history of the school began October 6, 1897, with its establishment on Vasilyevsky Island, becoming the first 12-grade primary school in Saint Petersburg. The namesake of the school is Catherine II (Catherine the Great), whose 100th anniversary was being celebrated that year.

The establishment of the institution was a very significant event in the history of St. Petersburg, as the school was a first step by the local government to address and solve a number of problems that existed within the primary education system at the time.
The initiative of building the school was led by Mikhail Stasyulevich, a prominent historian, publisher, public figure, and chairman of the Commission on Public Education. Stasyulevich sought to create an institution where both young men and women would be able to coexist and learn together. As a result of this, however, Stasyulevich encountered many opponents, and constantly fought against those who sought to defend the old type of primary school. The most serious objection was an indication of the "great danger of schools having several classes as the source of infectious diseases." Despite these setbacks,  the project had still gained majority support by City Council, and the school was erected. The Emperor Nikolay II was familiar with the project and approved it himself. The school itself was designed by A. R. Geshvend, who was elected by the Commission to be the architect of the school building. Work began on the school on May 24, 1896 completed in September of the following. The school was then opened on October 6, 1897, and was blessed by the home church 33 days later on November 9, 1896.

In 1965, the school became specialized in mathematics. In 1976, the school was united with School 38 and moved to a building at Shevchenko street, 23/2. Following the merger and move, the school's namesake was changed to Physico-Mathematical School. In 1990, the school was again renamed to Physico-Mathematical Gymnasium, but in 2002 it was finally renamed to Physico-Mathematical Lyceum. In 2005, the school was given back its historical building at the Sredniy prospect, and from that moment on the school has had two buildings: the first at Shevchenko street, where classes 5 to 7 are held, and the second near the Vasileostrovskaya metro station, where 8 - 11 classes are situated.

Famous alumni 

 Boris G. Smolkin, actor
 Lev Y. Lurie, TV presenter
 Andrei Borisenko, cosmonaut
 Andrey Krasko, actor
 Alexey Lebedinsky, singer
 Alex Tarn, writer
 Alexander Lazarev, Soviet theater and film actor
 Vladimir Churov, chairman of the Central Election Commission of Russia
 Boris A. Yermakov, scientist
 Maria Chudnovsky, mathematics professor at Princeton
 Marina Neyolova, actress
 Alexei Ivanovich Sergeev, acting vice-governor, St. Petersburg
 Nikolai Nikandrov, president of RW
Pavel Belov, scientist
 Dmitry Dmitriyenko, Governor of Murmansk
 Eugene Lazarenko, a member of rock band Multfilmy
 Mikhail Berg, writer

See also 
 Saint Petersburg Lyceum 239

References

External links 
 Official web site of Lyceum 30
 Information about the Lyceum at city portal
 A website dedicated to a history of the school

Schools in Saint Petersburg
Educational institutions established in 1897
1897 establishments in the Russian Empire
Lyceums in Russia